The Gold Cross Medal (GCM) is a decoration of the Armed Forces of the Philippines which recognizes gallantry in action.  It is the fourth highest military award of the Philippines. It is awarded by the Chief of Staff of the Armed Forces of the Philippines, or other senior commanders, to members of the Armed Forces of the Philippines for gallantry in action not warranting the award of the Distinguished Conduct Star.

Description of the award

The award is a golden Maltese cross with a grooved border in between the arms of the cross.  In the center of the cross, in the gold relief, is a left facing profile of Manuel L. Quezon on a dark blue disc.  The disc is encircled by a wreath of laurel leaves in gold, superimposed on the cross. The metal loop is in gold fixed at the top arm of the cross.  The cross is suspended from a ribbon of light blue with three thin vertical white lines in the center of the ribbon.

References

Citations

Bibliography
 The AFP Adjutant General, AFP Awards and Decorations Handbook, 1995, 1997, OTAG.

Military awards and decorations of the Philippines